Stockton Wood and Down is a 61.5 hectare biological Site of Special Scientific Interest in the southwest of Stockton parish in Wiltshire, England, notified in 1951.

Sources
 English Nature citation sheet for the site (accessed 14 August 2006)

External links
 English Nature website (SSSI information)

Sites of Special Scientific Interest in Wiltshire
Sites of Special Scientific Interest notified in 1951